The Music Victoria Awards of 2017 are the 12th Annual Music Victoria Awards and consist of a series of awards, presented on 22 November 2017. For the first time this year, the Best Regional Venue award was separated into of over and under 50 gigs per year.

Music Victoria CEO, Patrick Donovan commended this year's impressive talent saying, "Congratulations to all of the winners and nominees. We are very proud that many of these winners haven't just made an impact in Australia over the last 12 months, but acts such as Jen Cloher, The Teskey Brothers, King Gizzard & the Lizard Wizard and A.B. Original have been flying the Victorian flag overseas."

Hall of Fame inductees
 Tony Cohen

Outstanding Achievement Award
 Zo Damage

Zo Damage is music photographer. Her 365 Day Live Music Photography Project and book The Damage Report whereby she photographed a band or more daily for a year, wrapping it up with a sold-out exhibition and book launch at Arts Centre Melbourne.

Award nominees and winners

All genre Awards
Winners indicated in boldface, with other nominees in plain.

Genre Specific Awards
Voted by a select industry panel

References

External links
 

2017 in Australian music
2017 music awards
Music Victoria Awards